The discography of Styles P, an American hip hop recording artist consists of fifteen solo studio albums, two extended plays, sixteen mixtapes, 5 collaborative albums, 30 singles and one promotional single.

Albums

Studio albums

Collaborative albums

Mixtapes

Singles

As lead artist

As featured artist

Guest appearances

Music videos

See also
The Lox discography

References

External links

Hip hop discographies
Discographies of American artists